Paul Merton's Secret Stations is a British travel documentary television series, first broadcast on 1 May 2016 on Channel 4. Presented by Paul Merton, the series focuses on some of the little used stations in Great Britain which operate as request stops. Reviews were largely positive but not overly so, focussing on both the subject matter and Merton's contribution to argue how the series elevated itself above other series in the genre.

Genesis 
The series was one of a number of new commissions by More4 which focused on "traditional Britain" with series fronted by celebrities.

Synopsis 
The series was inspired by travel writer Dixe Wills' 2014 book Tiny Stations, and Wills is interviewed in the first episode. The introduction to the series explains that the railway network of Great Britain has a total of 152 request stops, "tiny, out of the way stations", a relatively small total (around 6%) of the total number found on the network's  of track. It argues that these are often the most overlooked stations in terms of travelogues, and so deserve to be visited to explore their secrets, many of which will be unknown as they are by definition, not on the tourist trail. Merton visits 17 stations (listed below), some of which are on the same line - and while most are in remote rural areas (by virtue of the fact that request stops are for little used stations), the series also includes some urban locations. During a visit, Merton covers both the history of the station, and of associated people or places.

Stations 

As the first series ended, Dixe Wills writing in a piece for The Guardian said there were still more than enough interesting request stops to justify a second series, pointing to the examples of Bootle, Buckenham, Conwy, Dolgarrog, Dunrobin Castle, Llanfairpwll, Lympstone Commando, The Lakes and Penychain.

Production 
The series was made by Brown Bob Productions Ltd for Channel 4, executive produced by Jacqueline Hewer, and directed by Ewen Thomson. The series makes extensive use of aerial filming.

Presenter 
Although Merton is primarily known as a comedian and as a panelist on Have I Got News For You, he had also been presenting travel documentaries since 2007. In the introduction to the series he explains he "loves railways and everything about them", and that his fascination with rail travel stemmed from the fact his father was a train driver on the London Underground (Merton himself preferring journeys with a view). Despite his love of train travel, he stated he hadn't known about the concept of request stops until making the series. The spokespeople for the campaign group Friends of Reddish South Station, who featured in the series, praised Merton's level of knowledge and evident research into their campaign.

Broadcast 
The series was first broadcast on Channel 4 in the 8pm-9pm slot on Sunday nights.

Episodes

Reception 
According to Claire Webb of the Radio Times, Merton was "in his element pootling around railways with a flat cap and a boyish grin". Sam Wollaston of The Guardian, attracted to the series by Merton as opposed to love for travelogues, also observed that Merton pootles about, in the process producing a gentle but rather nice addition to the genre. Ben Arnold of the same paper stated that "Beneath a curiously niche premise....is a fairly standard, albeit charming, British travelogue show". Gerard O'Donovan of The Telegraph gave it three out of fives stars, arguing that Merton's role was obviously to wring out something worth saying from unpromising prospects, also observing that he tootled about, concluding that the outcome was worth a look, but was unlikely to become destination viewing. According to the Press Association it was the combination of the obscure subject matter and Merton's comedic style that elevated this series above the many similar celebrity presented travelogues before it, arguing also that it is Merton's sheer enthusiasm for the subject matter that makes it engaging viewing. Matt Baylis of the Daily Express was less enthused, claiming the show's content was not always that interesting and even missed out pertinent details, leading him to lament that the show had not been presented by the expert, Dixe Wills, who featured in episode 1.

References 

Channel 4 documentaries
Works about rail transport
2016 British television series debuts
2016 British television series endings
2010s British documentary television series
2010s British travel television series
English-language television shows